Belle Plain is a populated place in Callahan County, Texas, United States.

History

In 1875, a man named Nelson M. Smith purchased land on which he planned to build a college. He platted a townsite to accompany the new school, and though the origin of the town's unusual name is not completely clear, it has long been speculated that it was named after Katie Belle Magee, the first child born at the new town site. By the following year, the town had three businesses and an estimated population of about 65 residents. When Callahan County was organized in 1877, voters chose Belle Plain as the seat of government. The town's first newspaper was established in 1879, and by the mid-1880s Belle Plain had become a center of commerce and industry for the county with several businesses, Smith's small Belle Plain College, and a population of around 400.

As was with many towns on the Texas frontier in the 19th century, Belle Plain was doomed when it was bypassed by rail construction. Both town and college suffered, and as a result, experienced simultaneous and rapid decline. In 1883 the county seat was moved to nearby Baird; even the stone jailhouse was disassembled, transported in pieces, and re-assembled at its current location in Baird. Belle Plain College struggled along for a few more years, finally closing in 1892. By then, the town was essentially abandoned, and the last remaining citizens had left Belle Plain by the time its post office was deactivated in 1907.

References

Handbook of Texas Online entry for Belle Plain
Texas Escapes Online Magazine article, including photos

Populated places in Callahan County, Texas
Ghost towns in North Texas